Vasant Shankar Huzurbazar (15 September 1919 – 15 November 1991) was an Indian statistician from Kolhapur. Huzurbazar was the founder head of the department of statistics, University of Pune from 1953 to 1976.  From 1979 to 1991, he served as professor at University of Denver, Colorado until his death. He served as visiting professor for two years to the Iowa State University in 1962.

In 1974, Huzurbazar was awarded the Padma Bhushan from Government of India for his contributions to the field of statistics.
In 1983 he was elected as a Fellow of the American Statistical Association.

Career
Huzurbazar completed his high school from Rajaram High school, Kolhapur. He did his B.Sc. from University of Mumbai and M.Sc. in statistics from Banaras Hindu University during 1940–1941. Huzurbazar earned his Ph.D. in statistics from University of Cambridge in 1950; his advisor was Harold Jeffreys. Huzurbazar worked in the Gauhati University, Lucknow University and also in the Bureau of Economics and Statistics of Government of Bombay.

Personal
Huzurbazar's two daughters, Snehalata V. Huzurbazar and Aparna V. Huzurbazar, both became notable statisticians.

Works

References

External links
 
 

University of Mumbai alumni
University of Denver faculty
Recipients of the Padma Bhushan in literature & education
1919 births
1991 deaths
Indian statisticians
20th-century Indian mathematicians
Academic staff of Savitribai Phule Pune University
Scientists from Maharashtra
Marathi people
People from Kolhapur
Alumni of the University of Cambridge
Fellows of the American Statistical Association